Gagarinsky District, Moscow  is an administrative district (raion) of South-Western Administrative Okrug, and one of the 125 raions of Moscow, Russia.
Population - 72,072. Established in 1995.

Education
School No. 1 is in this district.

See also
Administrative divisions of Moscow

References

Notes

Sources

Districts of Moscow